Österberg is a Swedish surname. Notable people with the name include:

 Anders Österberg (born 1981), Swedish politician
 Iggy Pop (born 1947), American singer, birth name James Österberg
 Laura Österberg Kalmari (born 1979), Finnish football player
 Martina Bergman-Österberg (1849–1915), Swedish-born physical education instructor
 Mikael Österberg (born 1986), Swedish ice hockey defenceman
 Sven-Erik Österberg (born 1955), Swedish politician

See also
 Osterberg, German municipality
 Østerberg, surname

Swedish-language surnames